Bima Train is an executive class train that is operated by PT Kereta Api Indonesia (Persero) in Java with the service running between Gambir Station (GMR) - Surabaya Gubeng Station (SGU) and vice versa. Bima was initially an acronym for "Biru Malam" lit. Night Blue.

Uniquely, this train is not through the northern route, but through the southern route, because to increase the occupancy of passengers who take the train route Jakarta-Surabaya through the southern route.

Although the Satwa class, KA Bima is an Argo class Executive train and uses the Argo train, in this case is the ex-Argo Bromo train. This train is the first AC executive train and the oldest train that still operates in Indonesia.

External links 
 Rail transport in Indonesia
 List of named passenger trains of Indonesia
Passenger rail transport in Indonesia